András Lelkes (born 22 December 1935) is a Hungarian gymnast. He competed in eight events at the 1964 Summer Olympics.

References

External links
 

1935 births
Living people
Hungarian male artistic gymnasts
Olympic gymnasts of Hungary
Gymnasts at the 1964 Summer Olympics
People from Kalocsa
Sportspeople from Bács-Kiskun County